East Hill Cliff Railway, or East Hill Lift, is a funicular railway located in the English seaside town of Hastings. It provides access to Hastings Country Park via the East Hill, which overlooks the Old Town and Rock-a-Nore, an area to the east of Hastings. The line provides views over The Stade, home to the largest beach-launched fishing fleet in Europe.

The line is owned and operated by Hastings Borough Council and has the following technical parameters:

Length: 
Gradient: 78%
Cars: 2
Capacity: 16 passengers per car
Configuration: Double track
Gauge: 
Traction: Electricity

The line was opened in August 1902 by Hastings Borough Council. It was originally operated on the water balance principle, and the twin towers of the upper station contained water tanks for this purpose. The line was modernised between 1973 and 1976, during which time it was converted to electric operation and new cars were provided.

The line was shut in June 2007 because of an incident where a fault in a control panel caused the cars to fail to stop at the correct point, resulting in damage to both cars and stations. In 2008, Hastings Borough Council decided on a major refurbishment involving new cars and new control and safety systems, together with repairs to the damaged stations.
The line reopened in March 2010.

Following the closure of lines in Broadstairs and Margate, the East Hill Cliff Railway is now the steepest funicular railway in the United Kingdom. It is complemented by the West Hill Cliff Railway, which provides access to Hastings Castle and the Smugglers Adventure in St. Clements Caves.

A model of the East Hill Cliff Railway is on public display at the Brighton Toy and Model Museum.

See also 
 List of funicular railways

References

External links 

Article on Hastings Cliff Railways from The Heritage Trail web site
Article on Hastings Cliff Railways from the Funicular Railways of the UK web site
Archive photo looking down railway from top station (c1925)
Article about sound installation in the East Hill Cliff Railway as part of the 2018 Coastal Currents Art Festival

Transport in Hastings
Funicular railways in the United Kingdom
Tourist attractions in East Sussex
Former water-powered funicular railways converted to electricity
5 ft gauge railways in the United Kingdom
Railway lines opened in 1903